Diario de los Andes is a Venezuelan regional newspaper, circulated in the Venezuelan Andes states of Trujillo, Táchira and Mérida. The original Trujillo edition was established in the late 1970s, while the Táchira and Mérida editions were established in the 1990s.

See also
 List of newspapers in Venezuela

References

External links
  

Spanish-language newspapers
Mass media in Venezuela
Newspapers published in Venezuela